Unwed Mother is a 1958 American drama film directed by Walter A. Doniger and starring Norma Moore, Robert Vaughn, Billie Bird, Diana Darrin and Jeanne Cooper.

Plot
The plot concerns Betty Miller (Norma Moore), a country girl who moves from a farming community to Los Angeles. She falls in love with a smooth-talking grifter, Don Bigelow (Robert Vaughn), who gets her pregnant, then abandons her. After visiting a drunken abortionist (Timothy Carey), Betty decides to give the baby up for adoption. But eventually she comes to regret that decision and pursues the foster parents who adopted her child.

Cast
 Norma Moore as Betty Miller
 Robert Vaughn as Don Bigelow
 Diana Darrin as Mousie
 Billie Bird as Gertie
 Jeanne Cooper as Mrs. Horton
 Ron Hargrave as Ben
 Kathleen Hughes as Linda
 Sam Buffington as Mr. Paully
 Claire Carleton as Mrs. Miller
 Colette Jackson as Louella
 Timothy Carey as Doctor
 Ken Lynch as Ray Curtis
 Dorothy Adams as Mrs. Paully
 Joan Lora as Mary Ellen
 Ralph Gamble as Minister

References

Sources

External links
 
 
 
 Lobby card for Unwed Mother at The Timothy Carey Experience

1958 films
1958 drama films
Allied Artists films
American black-and-white films
American drama films
Films directed by Walter Doniger
Films scored by Emil Newman
Films set in Los Angeles
Teenage pregnancy in film
1950s English-language films
1950s American films